Pete Chryplewicz (born April 27, 1974) is a former American football tight end who played in the NFL for the Detroit Lions.

High school career
Chryplewicz attended high school at Sterling Heights Stevenson High School in Sterling Heights, Michigan. He was named Michigan's top high school football recruit in 1991.

College career
Chryplewicz played for the University of Notre Dame, where he had 48 catches and five touchdowns over five seasons. He sat out the 1994 season with a broken wrist, which allowed him the fifth season of eligibility. He was a named an honorable mention to the 1996 College Football All-America Team.

NFL career
Chryplewicz was drafted by the Detroit Lions in the fifth round (135th overall) of the 1997 NFL Draft. He played three seasons with the Lions, recording nine catches and three touchdowns.

Personal
Chryplewicz is fluent in Polish. He now works in manufacturing sales.

References

People from Sterling Heights, Michigan
American football tight ends
Detroit Lions players
Notre Dame Fighting Irish football players
1974 births
Living people
Players of American football from Detroit